Agladrillia anadelgado is a species of sea snail, a marine gastropod mollusc in the family Drilliidae.

Description

Distribution
This species occurs in the Atlantic Ocean off Angola.

References

 Rolán E., Ryall P. & Horro J. (2007) Two new species of the genera Crassispira and Agladrillia (Gastropoda, Conoidea) from Angola. Neptunea 6(3): 25–31

External links
 

Endemic fauna of Angola
anadelgado
Gastropods described in 2007